St Dominic's GAA Club (Naomh Dominic) is a Gaelic Athletic Association club based in Knockcroghery, County Roscommon, Ireland. It draws its membership from the half parishes of Knockcroghery, St John's and Rahara. The current club was formed in 1973. Previously, up to four clubs from the parish were in existence at any one time. Since 2018, the club's official supporter has been Sport Direct as part of the companies GAA Grassroots Programme.

The club fields teams in both hurling and Gaelic football at all age groups as well as catering for camogie, and Ladies Football. The club is one of the countries most enduring competitors in the GAA's talent competition — Scor — winning county titles every year in all competitions.

St Dominic's was the home club of Jimmy Murray, captain of Roscommon GAA's All-Ireland Senior Football Championship winning teams of 1943 and 1944. The club also supplied Phelim Murray, Jack McQuillan and Liam Gilmartin to that side.

Honours
Roscommon Senior Football Championship (6): 1941, 1942, 1944, 1945, 1947, 1948
Roscommon Intermediate Football Championship (4): 1973, 1982, 1995, 2007, 2022
Roscommon Junior Football Championship (1): 2002
Roscommon Senior Hurling Championship (3): 1967, 1994, 1999

All-Ireland Medal winners
 Senior 1943: Jamesie Murray (c), Phelim Murray, Liam Gilmartin, Johnny Briens, Jim Brennan. Jack McQuillan also played with St Patrick's until a club was formed in his own parish of Ballyforan

 Minor 2006: Mark Miley

 Minor 1951: Ollie Murray

 Minor 1939: Phelim Murray

 Junior 1939: Tony Murray

Gaelic games clubs in County Roscommon
Gaelic football clubs in County Roscommon
Hurling clubs in County Roscommon